John Charles Petro (born 8 February 2001) is a Malawian footballer who plays as a defender for Liga I side FC Botoșani and the Malawi national team.

Club career
Petro joined Big Bullets in 2018, initially playing with their reserve squad in the second-tier Southern Region Football League before being promoted to the first team ahead of the 2019 season, making an instant impact and playing an instrumental role in their second consecutive Super League championship win. For his performance filling in the gap left by injured team captain John Lanjesi, he was named Defender of the Year while also being nominated for the Player of the Year award at the annual league awards ceremony.

After rejecting a trial with South African side Polokwane City, Petro instead underwent a month-long trial at Moldovan side Sheriff Tiraspol in early 2020. He officially made the move to the club by signing a three-year deal in February.

International career
Petro represented the Malawi national under-20 football team at the 2017 COSAFA U-20 Cup and during the 2019 Africa U-20 Cup of Nations qualifiers.

He made his senior international debut on 20 April 2019, replacing Gomezgani Chirwa during a 0–0 draw against Eswatini in the 2020 African Nations Championship qualifiers. He also played for Malawi at the 2019 COSAFA Cup and 2022 FIFA World Cup qualification.

Career statistics

International

Honours

Club
Big Bullets
 Super League of Malawi: 2019

Sheriff Tiraspol
Divizia Națională: 2020–21, 2021–22
Moldovan Cup: 2021–22
Moldovan Super Cup runner-up: 2021

Individual
 Super League of Malawi Defender of the Year: 2019

References

External links
 
 
 
 

Living people
2001 births
Malawian footballers
Malawi international footballers
Association football defenders
Nyasa Big Bullets FC players
FC Sheriff Tiraspol players
Malawian expatriate footballers
Malawian expatriate sportspeople in Moldova
Expatriate footballers in Moldova
People from Blantyre
Malawi under-20 international footballers
Moldovan Super Liga players
Liga I players
FC Botoșani players
2021 Africa Cup of Nations players